Hubert Dean Shurtz (July 1, 1923 – September 12, 2000) was an American football player who played tackle in the National Football League (NFL) for one season with the Pittsburgh Steelers. He was drafted by the Philadelphia Eagles in the 1947 NFL draft but did not play for the team. He attended Louisiana State University, where he played college football for the LSU Tigers football team. Shurtz played in 12 games for the Steelers in 1948, starting in one of them, and he had one fumble recovery.

References

1923 births
2000 deaths
Pittsburgh Steelers players
Players of American football from Illinois
People from Pinckneyville, Illinois
American football tackles
LSU Tigers football players
People from Destrehan, Louisiana